Oleksandr Zinchenko may refer to:

Oleksandr Zinchenko (politician) (1957–2010), Ukrainian politician
Oleksandr Zinchenko (footballer) (born 1996), Ukrainian footballer